Tuy Hoa Airport  is located just south of Tuy Hòa within the Phú Yên Province, along the central coast of southern Vietnam.

It was built in 1966 for the United States Air Force as Tuy Hoa Air Base. It was used by the U.S. Air Force (1966–70) and U.S. Army (1970-71), during the Vietnam War. It was transferred to the Republic of Vietnam in 1971, and came under Communist control after the South Vietnamese collapse of 1975.

Airlines and destinations

References

External links

Tuy Hoa
Airports in Vietnam
Buildings and structures in Phú Yên province